Adolfo Clouthier (15 March 1909 – 12 April 2001) was a Mexican athlete. He competed in the men's javelin throw at the 1932 Summer Olympics.

References

External links
 

1909 births
2001 deaths
Athletes (track and field) at the 1932 Summer Olympics
Mexican male javelin throwers
Olympic athletes of Mexico
Sportspeople from Culiacán